We Shall Not Be Shaken is Matt Redman's critically acclaimed seventh studio album. It was released in the US on August 25, 2009 and in Europe on September 4, 2009.

Track listing

Personnel 
 Matt Redman – lead vocals 
 Robert Marvin – keyboards (1-6, 8-11), programming (1-6, 8-11)
 Nathan Nockels – keyboards (1-5, 8, 11), programming (1-5, 8, 11)
 Tim Wanstall – keyboards (3, 4, 7, 12), programming (3, 4, 7, 12)
 Cason Cooley – keyboards (6, 7, 10), programming (6, 7, 10)
 Josiah Bell – keyboards (9), programming (9)
 Andy Selby – keyboards (9), programming (9)
 Tyler Burkam – guitars (1, 3, 4, 5, 8-11)
 David May – guitars (1, 6, 7, 8-11)
 Gary Burnette – guitars (4, 6, 7, 9, 10)
 Cary Barlowe – guitars (4)
 Tony Lucido – bass (1-11)
 Jeremy Lutito – drums (1-11)
 Brent Kutzle – cello (12)
 Bryan Brown – backing vocals (1, 3, 4, 6, 8, 9, 10)
 Jonas Myrin – backing vocals (2-7, 10, 11)
 Christa Black – backing vocals (3, 4, 6, 10)
 Beth Redman – backing vocals (3, 4, 6, 10)

Production 
 Robert Marvin – producer, recording
 Louie Giglio – executive producer 
 Les Moir – executive producer 
 Brad O'Donnell – executive producer 
 Joe Baldridge – vocal recording 
 Nathan Nockels – vocal recording 
 Travis Brigman – recording assistant 
 F. Reid Shippen – mixing 
 Buckley Miller – mix assistant 
 Greg Calbi – mastering 
 Gary Dorsey – art direction, design 
 David Molnar – photography 
 Shelley Giglio – management

Studios
 Recorded at Platinum Lab (Nashville, Tennessee); Dutchland Studios; Berwick Lane (Atlanta, Georgia).
 Mixed at Robot Lemon (Nashville, Tennessee).
 Mastered at Sterling Sound (New York, NY).

Singles
"This is How We Know" (2009)
"You Alone Can Rescue" (2010)

References

External links
We Shall Not Be Shaken - Matt Redman at Worship Leader. Web Site by Taylor Digital

2009 albums
Matt Redman albums